Kosmos 68 ( meaning Cosmos 68) or Zenit-2 No.29 was a Soviet, first generation, low resolution, optical film-return reconnaissance satellite launched in 1965.

Kosmos 68 was launched by a Vostok-2 rocket, serial number U15001-01, flying from Site 31/6 at the Baikonur Cosmodrome. The launch took place at 10:04 GMT on 15 June 1965, and following its successful arrival in orbit the spacecraft received its Kosmos designation; along with the International Designator 1965-046A and the Satellite Catalog Number 01404.

On 23 June 1965, after eight days in orbit, the satellite was deorbited with its return capsule descending by parachute for recovery by Soviet forces.

References

Kosmos satellites
Spacecraft launched in 1965
Spacecraft which reentered in 1965
Zenit-2 satellites